

Aalborg Zoo is a zoo located near the center of Aalborg in Denmark.
Every year, Aalborg Zoo is visited by around 375,000 guests.

At the entrance, one can see the sculpture Det gode kup ("the good bargain") from 1925, made by artist C.J. Bonnesen. The sculpture was donated to Aalborg Zoo from the Urban brewery.

History

The zoo was opened in April 1935. Throughout the recent decades, Aalborg Zoo has put more emphasis on viability and conservation of nature, and today it plays a major role in various global projects on animal conservation, breeding, education, research and focus on fair trade.

Conservation

Aalborg Zoo participates in many international breeding programmes in order to preserve endangered animals. Aalborg Zoo got an environment certificate and the first zoological garden, and the overall purpose of the zoo is to preserve nature. Aalborg Zoo has made their mark in many ways with projects on conservation of nature and environment. For example, Aalborg Zoo supports the Payamino Indians' efforts to preserve  of endangered rainforest in Ecuador.

References

External links

Web makes baby polar bear famous — Article on Milak, the newest polar bear cub at Aalborg Zoo
Webcam 1 of the polar bear habitat
Webcam 2 of the polar bear habitat

Zoos in Denmark
Buildings and structures in Aalborg
Tourist attractions in Aalborg
Zoos established in 1935
1935 establishments in Denmark